Princeton Nurseries was a large commercial plant nursery near Kingston, New Jersey. Founded in 1913 by William Flemer Sr., it once was the largest commercial nursery in the United States. The company stopped operations here in 1995. It was added to the National Register of Historic Places as the Princeton Nurseries Historic District on August 28, 2018.

Horticultural introductions
 Ulmus americana 'Princeton' – 'Princeton' American Elm

Gallery

See also
 Washington Road Elm Allée

References

External links
 
 
 "Ferns & Trees Nursery" Affordable Grasses & Plants.

Plant nurseries
Arboreta in New Jersey
Plainsboro Township, New Jersey
South Brunswick, New Jersey
National Register of Historic Places in Middlesex County, New Jersey
Historic districts on the National Register of Historic Places in New Jersey
New Jersey Register of Historic Places
1913 establishments in New Jersey